The Secret of Mountain Lake is a 1954 Soviet adventure film directed by Aleksandr Rou.

Plot 
In the fields and gardens of a large village in the mountains of Armenia there is a severe drought. In the past, there was a legend, according to which a river flowed here, but a monster named Deve hid its waters from the inhabitants of the village. Suddenly the village is visited by a group of geologists. Residents of the village of Kamo, Nikita and Grikor decide to help them.

Starring 
 Gurgen Gabrielyan as Grandfather Asatur
 Ye. Harutyunyan as Granny Nargiz
 V. Danielyan as Aram Mikhailovich
 George Ashughyan as Bagrat Stepanovich (as G. Ashughyan)
 Tatul Dilakyan as Eghishe
 Arus Asryan as Sona
 L. Leonidov as Andrey Petrovich
 Vahagn Bagratuni as Geologist (as V. Bagratuni)
 Garri Musheghyan as Geologist (as G. Musheghyan)
 Lilik Hovhannisyan as Karine
 B. Kerobyan as Dev
 Nerses Hovhannisyan as Kamo

References

External links 
 

1954 films
1950s Russian-language films
Soviet adventure films
1954 adventure films